Carolyn Roscoe (born August 2, 1966), is a female former diver who competed for Great Britain and England.

Diving career
Roscoe represented Great Britain at the 1984 Summer Olympics and the 1988 Summer Olympics.

She also represented England in both the 3 metres springboard and 10 metres platform events, at the 1986 Commonwealth Games in Edinburgh, Scotland.

She was a member of 'The Ladies' Diving Club.

References

1966 births
English female divers
Divers at the 1986 Commonwealth Games
Living people
Olympic divers of Great Britain
Divers at the 1984 Summer Olympics
Divers at the 1988 Summer Olympics
Commonwealth Games competitors for England